The 2020–21 NBA season was the Celtics' 75th season in the National Basketball Association (NBA).  As a result of the COVID-19 pandemic, the regular season for the league began on December 22, 2020 and featured a 72-game schedule rather than the typical 82-game schedule. The Celtics finished the regular season with a 36–36 record, and clinched a playoff spot after defeating the Washington Wizards with a score of 118–110 in the play-in tournament.

In the opening round of the playoffs, the Celtics were defeated by the Brooklyn Nets in five games. Following the season, Danny Ainge left his position as general manager, and named head coach Brad Stevens as his replacement.

Draft picks

Roster

Standings

Division

Conference

Notes
 z – Clinched home court advantage for the entire playoffs
 c – Clinched home court advantage for the conference playoffs
 y – Clinched division title
 x – Clinched playoff spot
 * – Division leader

Game log

Preseason

|- style="background:#fbb;"
| 1
| December 15
| @ Philadelphia
| 
| Jeff Teague (18)
| Jaylen Brown (8)
| Waters, G. Williams (3)
| Wells Fargo Center
| 0–1
|- style="background:#fbb"
| 2
| December 18
| Brooklyn
| 
| Jayson Tatum (19)
| Daniel Theis (9)
| Tremont Waters (5)
| TD Garden
| 0–2

Regular season

|-style="background:#cfc;"
| 1
| December 23
| Milwaukee
| 
| Jaylen Brown (33)
| Tristan Thompson (8)
| Marcus Smart (7)
| TD Garden0
| 1–0
|-style="background:#fcc;"
| 2
| December 25
| Brooklyn
| 
| Jaylen Brown (27)
| Brown, Tatum, Thompson (8)
| Marcus Smart (6)
| TD Garden0
| 1–1
|-style="background:#fcc;"
| 3
| December 27
| @ Indiana
| 
| Jayson Tatum (25)
| Jayson Tatum (11)
| Marcus Smart (6)
| Bankers Life Fieldhouse0
| 1–2
|-style="background:#cfc;"
| 4
| December 29
| @ Indiana
| 
| Jayson Tatum (27)
| Jayson Tatum (11)
| Pritchard, Smart (6)
| Bankers Life Fieldhouse0
| 2–2
|-style="background:#cfc;"
| 5
| December 30
| Memphis
| 
| Jaylen Brown (42)
| Robert Williams III (10)
| Brown, Smart, Teague (4)
| TD Garden0
| 3–2

|-style="background:#fcc;"
| 6
| January 1
| @ Detroit
| 
| Jayson Tatum (28)
| Brown, Thompson (9)
| Marcus Smart (9)
| Little Caesars Arena0
| 3–3
|-style="background:#cfc;"
| 7
| January 3
| @ Detroit
| 
| Jaylen Brown (31)
| Tristan Thompson (11)
| Jayson Tatum (12)
| Little Caesars Arena0
| 4–3
|-style="background:#cfc;"
| 8
| January 4
| @ Toronto
| 
| Jayson Tatum (40)
| Robert Williams III (15)
| Payton Pritchard (8)
| Amalie Arena3,740
| 5–3
|-style="background:#cfc;"
| 9
| January 6
| @ Miami
| 
| Jayson Tatum (27)
| Jaylen Brown (12)
| Marcus Smart (6)
| AmericanAirlines Arena0
| 6–3
|-style="background:#cfc;"
| 10
| January 8
| Washington
| 
| Jayson Tatum (32)
| Jaylen Brown (13)
| Brown, Smart (5)
| TD Garden0
| 7–3
|-style="background:#ccc;"
| –
| January 10
| Miami
| colspan="6" | Postponed (COVID-19) (Makeup date: May 11)
|-style="background:#ccc;"
| –
| January 12
| @ Chicago
| colspan="6" | Postponed (COVID-19) (Makeup date: May 7)
|-style="background:#ccc;"
| –
| January 13
| Orlando
| colspan="6" | Postponed (COVID-19) (Makeup date: March 21)
|-style="background:#cfc;"
| 11
| January 15
| Orlando
| 
| Jaylen Brown (21)
| Tristan Thompson (11)
| Jaylen Brown (8)
| TD Garden0
| 8–3
|-style="background:#fcc;"
| 12
| January 17
| New York
| 
| Jaylen Brown (25)
| Daniel Theis (7)
| Kemba Walker (4)
| TD Garden0
| 8–4
|-style="background:#fcc;"
| 13
| January 20
| @ Philadelphia
| 
| Jaylen Brown (26)
| Daniel Theis (10)
| Kemba Walker (6)
| Wells Fargo Center0
| 8–5
|-style="background:#fcc;"
| 14
| January 22
| @ Philadelphia
| 
| Jaylen Brown (42)
| Jaylen Brown (9)
| Marcus Smart (7)
| Wells Fargo Center0
| 8–6
|-style="background:#cfc;"
| 15
| January 24
| Cleveland
| 
| Jaylen Brown (33)
| Tristan Thompson (12)
| Marcus Smart (9)
| TD Garden0
| 9–6
|-style="background:#cfc;"
| 16
| January 25
| @ Chicago
| 
| Jaylen Brown (26)
| Tristan Thompson (10)
| Marcus Smart (11)
| United Center0
| 10–6
|-style="background:#fcc;"
| 17
| January 27
| @ San Antonio
| 
| Jayson Tatum (25)
| Tristan Thompson (8)
| Jaylen Brown (5)
| AT&T Center0
| 10–7
|-style="background:#fcc;"
| 18
| January 30
| L. A. Lakers
| 
| Jayson Tatum (30)
| Jayson Tatum (9)
| Marcus Smart (7)
| TD Garden0
| 10–8

|-style="background:#cfc;"
| 19
| February 2
| @ Golden State
| 
| Jayson Tatum (27)
| Daniel Theis (11)
| Kemba Walker (5)
| Chase Center0
| 11–8
|-style="background:#fcc;"
| 20
| February 3
| @ Sacramento
| 
| Jayson Tatum (27)
| Tristan Thompson (10)
| Jayson Tatum (10)
| Golden 1 Center0
| 11–9
|-style="background:#cfc;"
| 21
| February 5
| @ L. A. Clippers
| 
| Jayson Tatum (34)
| Tatum, Thompson (7)
| Teague, Walker (4)
| Staples Center0
| 12–9
|-style="background:#fcc;"
| 22
| February 7
| @ Phoenix
| 
| Jayson Tatum (23)
| Tristan Thompson (12)
| Jayson Tatum (7)
| Phoenix Suns Arena1,493
| 12–10
|-style="background:#fcc;"
| 23
| February 9
| @ Utah
| 
| Jaylen Brown (33)
| Jaylen Brown (8)
| Kemba Walker (7)
| Vivint Arena3,902
| 12–11
|-style="background:#cfc;"
| 24
| February 11
| Toronto
| 
| Semi Ojeleye (24)
| Tristan Thompson (11)
| Jaylen Brown (10)
| TD Garden0
| 13–11
|-style="background:#fcc;"
| 25
| February 12
| Detroit
| 
| Jayson Tatum (33)
| Jayson Tatum (11)
| Jayson Tatum (7)
| TD Garden0
| 13–12
|-style="background:#fcc;"
| 26
| February 14
| @ Washington
| 
| Brown, Walker (25)
| Brown, Walker (7)
| Jayson Tatum (4)
| Capital One Arena0
| 13–13
|-style="background:#cfc;"
| 27
| February 16
| Denver
| 
| Jaylen Brown (27)
| Tristan Thompson (12)
| Jayson Tatum (8)
| TD Garden0
| 14–13
|-style="background:#fcc;"
| 28
| February 17
| Atlanta
| 
| Jayson Tatum (35)
| Tristan Thompson (7)
| Jayson Tatum (6)
| TD Garden0
| 14–14
|-style="background:#cfc;"
| 29
| February 19
| Atlanta
| 
| Kemba Walker (28)
| Tatum, Theis (8)
| Brown, Tatum, Walker (6)
| TD Garden0
| 15–14
|-style="background:#fcc;"
| 30
| February 21
| @ New Orleans
| 
| Jayson Tatum (32)
| Robert Williams III (13)
| Jaylen Brown (9)
| Smoothie King Center1,940
| 15–15
|-style="background:#fcc;"
| 31
| February 23
| @ Dallas
| 
| Jaylen Brown (29)
| Tristan Thompson (10)
| Jaylen Brown (5)
| American Airlines Center3,338
| 15–16
|-style="background:#fcc;"
| 32
| February 24
| @ Atlanta
| 
| Jaylen Brown (17)
| Tristan Thompson (13)
| Brown, Teague (5)
| State Farm Arena1,537
| 15–17
|-style="background:#cfc;"
| 33
| February 26
| Indiana
| 
| Kemba Walker (32)
| Robert Williams III (11)
| Kemba Walker (6)
| TD Garden0
| 16–17
|-style="background:#cfc;"
| 34
| February 28
| Washington
| 
| Jayson Tatum (31)
| Tristan Thompson (13)
| Kemba Walker (8)
| TD Garden0
| 17–17

|-style="background:#cfc;"
| 35
| March 2
| L. A. Clippers
| 
| Kemba Walker (25)
| Tristan Thompson (9)
| Kemba Walker (6)
| TD Garden0
| 18–17
|-style="background:#cfc;"
| 36
| March 4
| Toronto
| 
| Jayson Tatum (27)
| Jayson Tatum (12)
| Kemba Walker (6)
| TD Garden0
| 19–17
|- align="center"
| colspan="9" style="background:#bbcaff;" | All-Star Break
|-style="background:#fcc;"
| 37
| March 11
| @ Brooklyn
| 
| Jayson Tatum (31)
| Daniel Theis (8)
| Jaylen Brown (6)
| Barclays Center1,374
| 19–18
|-style="background:#cfc;"
| 38
| March 14
| @ Houston
| 
| Jaylen Brown (24)
| Thompson, Williams III (13)
| Jayson Tatum (6)
| Toyota Center3,264
| 20–18
|-style="background:#fcc;"
| 39
| March 16
| Utah
| 
| Jayson Tatum (29)
| Daniel Theis (11)
| Jaylen Brown (7)
| TD Garden0
| 20–19
|-style="background:#fcc;"
| 40
| March 17
| @ Cleveland
| 
| Jayson Tatum (29)
| Robert Williams III (14)
| Daniel Theis (5)
| Rocket Mortgage FieldHouse4,100
| 20–20
|-style="background:#fcc;"
| 41
| March 19
| Sacramento
| 
| Jaylen Brown (19)
| Jaylen Brown (11)
| Kemba Walker (7)
| TD Garden0
| 20–21
|-style="background:#cfc;"
| 42
| March 21
| Orlando
| 
| Jaylen Brown (34)
| Daniel Theis (11)
| Marcus Smart (8)
| TD Garden0
| 21–21
|-style="background:#fcc;"
| 43
| March 22
| @ Memphis
| 
| Jaylen Brown (27)
| Jaylen Brown (9)
| Jeff Teague (6)
| FedExForum2,319
| 21–22
|-style="background:#fcc;"
| 44
| March 24
| @ Milwaukee
| 
| Jaylen Brown (24)
| Jaylen Brown (10)
| Smart, Walker (6)
| Fiserv Forum3,280
| 21–23
|-style="background:#cfc;"
| 45
| March 26
| @ Milwaukee
| 
| Jayson Tatum (34)
| Robert Williams III (9)
| Jayson Tatum (7)
| Fiserv Forum3,280
| 22–23
|-style="background:#cfc;"
| 46
| March 27
| @ Oklahoma City
| 
| Jayson Tatum (27)
| Robert Williams III (14)
| Marcus Smart (8)
| Chesapeake Energy Arena0
| 23–23
|-style="background:#fcc;"
| 47
| March 29
| New Orleans
| 
| Jayson Tatum (34)
| Robert Williams III (10)
| Tatum, Williams III (5)
| TD Garden2,298
| 23–24
|-style="background:#fcc;"
| 48
| March 31
| Dallas
| 
| Jayson Tatum (25)
| Jayson Tatum (9)
| Marcus Smart (7)
| TD Garden2,298
| 23–25

|-style="background:#cfc;"
| 49
| April 2
| Houston
| 
| Jayson Tatum (26)
| Jaylen Brown (11)
| Marcus Smart (10)
| TD Garden0
| 24–25
|-style="background:#cfc;"
| 50
| April 4
| Charlotte
| 
| Jayson Tatum (22)
| Tatum, Williams III (8)
| Walker, Fournier (6)
| TD Garden0
| 25–25
|-style="background:#fcc;"
| 51
| April 6
| Philadelphia
| 
| Jayson Tatum (20)
| Robert Williams III (9)
| Kemba Walker (6)
| TD Garden2,298
| 25–26
|-style="background:#cfc;"
| 52
| April 7
| New York
| 
| Jaylen Brown (32)
| Brown, Tatum, Williams III (10)
| Marcus Smart (9)
| TD Garden2,298
| 26–26
|-style="background:#cfc;"
| 53
| April 9
| Minnesota
| 
| Jayson Tatum (53)
| Jayson Tatum (10)
| Kemba Walker (9)
| TD Garden2,298
| 27–26
|-style="background:#cfc;"
| 54
| April 11
| @ Denver
| 
| Jayson Tatum (28)
| Jayson Tatum (10)
| Kemba Walker (6)
| Ball Arena4,032
| 28–26
|-style="background:#cfc;"
| 55
| April 13
| @ Portland
| 
| Jayson Tatum (32)
| Jayson Tatum (9)
| Smart, Walker (7)
| Moda Center0
| 29–26
|-style="background:#cfc;"
| 56
| April 15
| @ L. A. Lakers
| 
| Jaylen Brown (40)
| Jaylen Brown (9)
| Kemba Walker (7)
| Staples Center1,915
| 30–26
|-style="background:#cfc;"
| 57
| April 17
| Golden State
| 
| Jayson Tatum (44)
| Jayson Tatum (10)
| Marcus Smart (6)
| TD Garden2,298
| 31–26
|-style="background:#fcc;"
| 58
| April 19
| Chicago
| 
| Jaylen Brown (23)
| Jayson Tatum (13)
| Jayson Tatum (10)
| TD Garden0
| 31–27
|-style="background:#cfc;"
| 59
| April 22
| Phoenix
| 
| Kemba Walker (32)
| Tristan Thompson (12)
| Jayson Tatum (6)
| TD Garden2,298
| 32–27
|-style="background:#fcc;"
| 60
| April 23
| @ Brooklyn
| 
| Jayson Tatum (38)
| Jayson Tatum (10)
| Evan Fournier (5)
| Barclays Center1,773
| 32–28
|-style="background:#fcc;"
| 61
| April 25
| @ Charlotte
| 
| Brown, Walker (20)
| Jayson Tatum (11)
| Walker, Smart (4)
| Spectrum Center4,493
| 32–29
|-style="background:#fcc;"
| 62
| April 27
| Oklahoma City
| 
| Jaylen Brown (39)
| Jaylen Brown (11)
| Marcus Smart (6)
| TD Garden2,298
| 32–30
|-style="background:#cfc;"
| 63
| April 28
| Charlotte
| 
| Jaylen Brown (38)
| Tristan Thompson (13)
| Jayson Tatum (8)
| TD Garden2,298
| 33–30
|-style="background:#cfc;"
| 64
| April 30
| San Antonio
| 
| Jayson Tatum (60)
| Tristan Thompson (15)
| Marcus Smart (12)
| TD Garden2,298
| 34–30

|-style="background:#fcc;"
| 65
| May 2
| Portland
| 
| Jayson Tatum (33)
| Jaylen Brown (11)
| Marcus Smart (8)
| TD Garden0
| 34–31
|-style="background:#cfc;"
| 66
| May 5
| @ Orlando
| 
| Kemba Walker (32)
| Jayson Tatum (7)
| Marcus Smart (9)
| Amway Center4,249
| 35–31
|-style="background:#fcc;"
| 67
| May 7
| @ Chicago
| 
| Kemba Walker (33)
| Tristan Thompson (10)
| Marcus Smart (5)
| United Center3,399
| 35–32
|-style="background:#fcc;"
| 68
| May 9
| Miami
| 
| Evan Fournier (30)
| Tristan Thompson (12)
| Evan Fournier (8)
| TD Garden2,298
| 35–33
|-style="background:#fcc;"
| 69
| May 11
| Miami
| 
| Kemba Walker (36)
| Jayson Tatum (8)
| Evan Fournier (8)
| TD Garden4,789
| 35–34
|-style="background:#fcc;"
| 70
| May 12
| @ Cleveland
| 
| Jayson Tatum (29)
| Jayson Tatum (8)
| Pritchard, Waters (3)
| Rocket Mortgage FieldHouse4,148
| 35–35
|-style="background:#cfc;"
| 71
| May 15
| @ Minnesota
| 
| Jayson Tatum (26)
| Jayson Tatum (11)
| Tremont Waters (7)
| Target Center1,638
| 36–35
|-style="background:#fcc;"
| 72
| May 16
| @ New York
| 
| Jabari Parker (18)
| Tacko Fall (8)
| Payton Pritchard (6)
| Madison Square Garden1,981
| 36–36

Play-in

|-style="background:#cfc;"
| 1
| May 18
| Washington
| 
| Jayson Tatum (50)
| Tristan Thompson (12)
| Marcus Smart (6)
| TD Garden4,789
| 1–0

Playoffs

|-style="background:#fcc;"
| 1
| May 22
| @ Brooklyn
| 
| Jayson Tatum (22)
| Tristan Thompson (10)
| Smart, Tatum (5)
| Barclays Center14,391
| 0–1
|-style="background:#fcc;"
| 2
| May 25
| @ Brooklyn
| 
| Marcus Smart (19)
| Tristan Thompson (11)
| Kemba Walker (7)
| Barclays Center14,774
| 0–2
|-style="background:#cfc;"
| 3
| May 28
| Brooklyn
| 
| Jayson Tatum (50)
| Tristan Thompson (13)
| Jayson Tatum (7)
| TD Garden4,789
| 1–2
|-style="background:#fcc;"
| 4
| May 30
| Brooklyn
| 
| Jayson Tatum (40)
| Jayson Tatum (7)
| Marcus Smart (9)
| TD Garden17,226
| 1–3
|-style="background:#fcc;"
| 5
| June 1
| @ Brooklyn
| 
| Jayson Tatum (32)
| Tatum, Thompson (9)
| Jayson Tatum (5)
| Barclays Center14,993
| 1–4

Transactions

Trades

Free agency

Re-signed

Additions

Subtractions

References 

Boston Celtics seasons
Boston Celtics
Boston Celtics
Boston Celtics
Celtics
Celtics